White Croatia (also Great Croatia or Chrobatia; , also ) is the region from which part of the White Croats emigrated to the Western Balkans. Some historians believe that, after the migration of the White Croats in the 7th century, their former homeland gradually lost its primacy and was influenced by other Slavic peoples, such as Ukrainians, Poles and Czechs. Others say there was never a distinct polity known as Great or White Croatia. According to the medieval Chronicle of the Priest of Duklja, another area referred to as White Croatia was located south of Posavina along with Red Croatia in Dalmatia. The area to the west of White Croatia was known as White Serbia.

Sources
The 10th-century treatise De Administrando Imperio ("On the management of the Empire", later DAI), written in Greek by Constantine VII Porphyrogennetos, is the only known document that suggests "White Croatia" as the place from which Croats migrated to Dalmatia, bordering the coastline of the Adriatic Sea. In Chapter 30, under the heading "The Story of the Province of Dalmatia," it says that "the Croats at that time were dwelling beyond Bagibareia, where the Belocroats are now... The rest of the Croats stayed over near Francia, and are now called the Belocroats, that is, the White Croats, and have their own archon; they are subject to Otto, the great king of Francia, which is also Saxony, and are unbaptized, and intermarry and are friendly with the Turks".

In Chapter 31, "Of the Croats and of the Country They Now Dwell in", it says that Croats in Dalmatia "are descended from the unbaptized Croats, also called the ‘white’, who live beyond Turkey and next to Francia, and they border the Slavs, the unbaptized Serbs... ancient Croatia, also called "white", is still unbaptized to this day, as are also its neighboring Serbs... constantly plundered by the Franks and Turks and Pechenegs... live far away from sea; it takes 30 days of travel from the place where they live to the sea. The sea to which they come down to after 30 days, is that which is called dark".

In Chapter 32, "Of the Serbs and of the Country They Now Dwell in," it was said about the unbaptized ("white") Serbs, that "their neighbor is Francia, as is also Megali Croatia, the unbaptized, also called 'white.

Croatia Alba, or White Croatia, is referred to in the Latin Chronicle of the Priest of Duklja, compiled no earlier than the 12th century. This work refers to White Croatia as the lower part of Dalmatia (Croatia Alba, que et inferior Dalmatia dicitur), as opposed to Red Croatia, which refers to upper Dalmatia (Croatia Rubea, que et superior Dalmatia dicitur). According to 21st-century historian A. Mayorov, the territory of this Croatia Alba was the most developed and densely populated and formed the core of the emerging Croatian state.

In the undated part of twelfth-century Russian Primary Chronicle, which tells about the resettlement of the Slavs from the Danube, White Croats were mentioned once, together with Serbs and Chorutans (Carinthians). According to A. Mayorov, this account is based on Western European medieval tradition and agrees with the Chronicle of the Priest of Duklja.

In addition there are many other sources mentioning Croats inhabiting in Central Europe, and Eastern Europe among East Slavic tribes, but no one calls them "white".

Etymology
The epithets "white" for Croats and their homeland Croatia, as well "great" (megali) for Croatia, is in relation to the symbolism used in ancient times. "White" is related to the use of colors among Eurasian peoples to indicate cardinal directions. White meant "Western Croats/Croatia", in comparison to the lands to the east where they had lived. The epithet "great" probably signified "old, ancient, former" homeland for the White Croats and newly arrived Croats to the Roman province of Dalmatia. Historian A. Mayorov emphasizes that the term "White Croats" and the corresponding "White Croatia" are relatively new terms that were applied historically after the Croat migrated to new territories. According to the 10th-century De Administrando Imperio (DAI), Croats who remained living in their former lands near the borders of Francia were only recently been called "White Croats".

Dispute
In 21st-century scholarship, historians do not agree on the location or even the existence of Great Croatia and White Croatia. Scholars do believe that the Croats gradually moved from the East to the West and South. According to Majorov, in the 10th century, the ethnic Croats are believed to have been surviving in remnant communities, scattered in the West in Bohemia, with others in the East in Poland, Slovakia, and Ukraine. Given the tradition of using colours for cardinal directions, Leontii Voitovych argued that the Great Croatia referred to in the 6th century no longer existed in the 10th century. The term White Croatia was used to refer to the Western part of its territory. Some scholars such as F. Rački, M. Kos, L. Niederle and Nada Klaić believed in its existence, others such as V. Jagić, J. B. Bury, K. Jireček and A. Brückner have rejected the existence of an independent polity, while L. Hauptmann believed in its existence in the sense Constantine VII was referring to the Duchy of Bohemia. Similarly, V. V. Sedov noted that there is no archaeological material to prove its existence. However, recent archaeological research of 7-10th century sites in Western Ukraine suggests otherwise, that Great Croatia most probably was a polycentric proto-state.

Interpretations have differed over what geographic area the term Bagibaria refers to. Some scholars have related it to Babia Góra near the river Vistula and Kraków in Lesser Poland, but it is more commonly considered to be a reference to Bavaria. Tibor Živković notes that this term can come from the Latin name of Bavaria (Bagoaria or, less probably, Baioaria) and, therefore, the source of this information for the DAI could be of West European/Western Roman origin (possibly by Anastasius Bibliothecarius from Rome).

Another dispute is about the geographic reference point of the mentioned "sea to which they come down to after 30 days, is that which is called dark." Some scholars believe this is a reference to the Baltic Sea, to which people could travel in less than 15 days from Lesser Poland. Others say it is the Black Sea, to which travel would take around 30 days from Prykarpattia (river San, Upper Dniester and city of Przemyśl). The Byzantines knew of the present-day Black Sea very well, but they did not refer to it as "Black" or "Dark", but by a word meaning "Hospitable" (Εὔξεινος), a euphemism for "Inhospitable". They also used a different term for the word "sea" in its case ("Πόντος" (Póntos) and not "θάλασσα" (Thálassa)). However, more probable is a reference to the Black Sea because in DAI there's no reference to the Baltic Sea, the chapter has information usually found in 10th century Arabian sources like of Al-Masudi, the Black Sea was of more interest to the Eastern merchants and Byzantine Empire, and its Persian name "Dark Sea" (axšaēna-) was already well known. Other Arabian-Persian sources also describe a large Slavic state with the city Khordab ten days from Pechenegs, through which passes a river (Dniester) and is bounded by mountains (Carpathians), which places the Croats and Croatia in Prykarpattia.

The DAI has other contradictory information. Although the Croats are described as living near the Franks in the West, they were said to be subject to repeated raids by the Pecheneg, who lived far to the East of this territory. The DAI says that the Pechenegs lived north of the Hungarians, and that the Croats bordered the Hungarians on the south. These chapters are known to have been based on several archival sources. Łowmiański, Sedov and Majorov suggest that the DAI mistakenly referred to 7th-century locations and migrations of peoples based on the location of contemporary Croats in Duchy of Bohemia and different sources when the account was compiled. Łowmiański criticized the primary use of a source from the South (DAI) instead of sources from the North which makes them more reliable to determine the location of the Northern Croats.

In the 13th chapter which described the Hungarian neighbors, Franks to the West, Pechenegs to the North, and Moravians to the South, it is also mentioned that "on the other side of the mountains, the Croats are neighboring the Turks", however as are mentioned Pechenegs to the North while in the 4th century the Croats are mentioned as the Southern neighbors of the Hungarians, the account is of uncertain meaning, but most probably is referring to Croats living "on the other side" of Carpathian Mountains.

Territory versions

While the Czech and Polish scholars tended to diminish the existence of the Croats on their territory, Ukrainian and Russian scholars have tended to attribute the Croats with large and influential territories in the East. Polish scholars avoided to locate the Croats at Kraków and considered that did not border at Ruthenia because when Vladimir the Great attacked the Croats in 992 it would have been perceived as a call for war by Bolesław I the Brave. However, whether the Cherven Cities were inhabited by the Lendians or White Croats, and were independent from both Poland and Kievan Rus', it is part of a wider ethnographic dispute between Polish and Ukrainian-Russian historians.

White Croatia was initially thought to have been located along the Upper Elbe river in Northeastern Bohemia and/or around the Upper Vistula valley in Lesser Poland. This is based only the DAI description that they lived South-East of Bavaria, North of Hungary, and South of the White Serbs. However, due to other information, in the 19th century became common conclusion that they lived North and East of Carpathians, specifically Prykarpattia and Eastern Galicia.

In the 19th and early 20th century, Pavel Jozef Šafárik and Lubor Niederle combined both Western and Eastern concept on the localization of Croatia, specifically, to be extending from Eastern Galicia up to Northeastern Bohemia. Niederle, placing White Croatia in Prykarpattia, argued that they mainly were located on river Vistula, between Czech and Ukrainian Croats, and they formed one big alliance of Croatian tribes which fell apart when the Vistulan Croats migrated to the Western Balkans in the 7th century. Josef Markwart and Ljudmil Hauptmann also placed their main center on river Vistula. The Polish historians mostly were against the localization of Croatian homenland on river Vistula (eventually in Silesia), arguing it is based on loose evidence, and as such ignored Croats and White Croatia in their synthesis of the Polish history. It was in accordance with Czech and German historians who related it with the principality of Slavník dynasty on Upper Elbe river in Northeastern Bohemia, and considered that those Croats came from Ukrainian Croats on river Dniester, which argued Ukrainian and Russian historians. A. A. Šahmatov, S. M. Seredonjin and others located Croatia in Eastern Galicia.

In the second-half of 20th and early 21st century, Dušan Třeštík and Gerard Labuda identified White Croatia with the multi-tribal realm of Boleslaus I, Duke of Bohemia, while Třeštík and Jaroslav Bakala more precisely located them to present-day Silesia and North Bohemia (Podkrkonoší region). Richard Ekblom also placed them in Upper Silesia, and the area of Kraków, Poland. Tadeusz Lehr-Spławiński mostly agreed with Niederle's location around Vistula river. Francis Dvornik placed White Croatia in Galicia, western part of it was in Western Galicia with Kraków in Poland up to Northeastern Bohemian domain of the Slavnik dynasty while eastern part in Eastern Galicia (Upper Dniester). Łowmiański besides Prykarpattia and Zakarpattia, placed the main part of the Croats to the Upper Vistula valley in Lesser Poland, and that the accounts in DAI identified White Croatia with Duchy of Bohemia of Boleslaus I which at the time incorporated the territory of the Vistulans and Lendians, because they were attacked by the Pechenegs, and that according to the sources it is uncertain whether the White Croats lived around the Elbe river and placing them instead in Sudetes. Ivo Goldstein located White Croatia around Kraków. According to Noel Malcolm White Croatia was in the area of today's southern Poland. Krzysztof Fokt placed them in Upper Silesia in the 9th-10th century. Petr Charvát located them in Northern and Eastern Bohemia, noting that the Croat diaspora settlement follows the Carpathian range from Southeastern Poland to Krkonoše Mountains in Bohemia. T. Živković located White Croatia in Bohemia and Southern Poland as well. A. Mayorov distinguishes between the terms and concepts of "Great Croatia" and "White Croatia". He agrees that White Croatia and those Croats identified as "White" were a second concept appeared to have some historical presence in the Upper Elbe and Upper Vistula regions, but that Great Croatia, the motherland of the Croats, was primary concept located in Eastern Prykarpattia and Tisza river basin in Zakarpattia. Mayorov suggests that the author of the DAI made an attempt to reconcile the contradictions among various conflicting sources. Sedov believed that the Croats arose among the Antes of Penkovka culture. After that, they migrated West and settled in several groups in various places. In 1982, argued that one of these groups were Southwestern neighbours of the Dulebes, living in the Northern and Southern area of Eastern Prykarpattia. Ukrainian and Russian historians and archaeologists generally argue that Great Croatia, also in the sense of homeland from where emigrated to the Balkans, included almost all the lands of later historical region of Galicia.

Scholars tended to locate them on a large territory, N. P. Barsov situated the Croats in the wide area of Carpathian Mountains, on the slopes of Tatra Mountains to the river Tisza and Prut on the South, to the Dniester to the East, and the Vistula to the North. Many prominent scholars, including P. Šafárik, L. Niederle, V. Gruby, T. Lehr-Spławiński, B. Rybakov and V. Korolyuk considered that the lands from Western Bug and Upper Prut and Siret in the East up to Nisa and Upper Elbe in the West were originally inhabited by the Croats. According to Francis Dvornik, White Croatia extended from the Southern Bug and rivers Wieprz and San along the Poland-Ukraine border, to the slopes of Carpathian Mountains, including the Northern part of Slovakia, then from the rivers Netolica and Dudleba in upper Vltava, through Cidlina to the Krkonoše Mountains to the North and North-West. O. A Kupchynsʹkyĭ believed that Eastern Croats had territory from Prykarpattia (at the confluence of the  rivers Laborec and Ondava at the crest of the Carpathian Mountains), valley of Beskids, western coast of the river Wisłoka, along Sandomierz valley until middle San, near Dunajec and left coast of Vistula. He said they also likely occupied the upper watershed of the Tisza river at the Ukraine-Slovakia border. In other words, much of the lands of present-day Western Ukraine, Southeastern Poland and Northeastern Czechia. Sedov sharply criticized such assumptions, saying "these hypothetical constructions are now of purely historiographic interest, since they do not find any confirmation in archaeological materials".

According to recent archaeological research of material culture and conclusions on the ethno-tribal affiliation and territorial borders of the Carpathian region from 6th until 10th century, the tribal territory of the Croats ("Great Croatia") is unanimously considered by Ukrainian archaeologists to have included Prykarpattia and Zakarpattia, with eastern border the Upper Dniester basin, south-eastern the Khotyn upland beginning near Chernivtsi on the Prut River and ending in Khotyn on the Dniester River, northern border the watershed of the Western Bug and Dniester River, and western border in Western Carpathian ridges at Wisłoka the right tributary of Upper Vistula in Southeastern Poland. In the Eastern Bukovina region bordered with Tivertsi, in Eastern Podolia with Ulichs, to the North along Upper Bug River with Dulebes-Buzhans-Volhynians, to the Northwest with Lendians and West with Vistulans. The analysis of housing types, and especially oven cookers in Western Ukraine which "were made out of stone (the Middle and the Upper Dnister areas), or clay (mud and butte types, Volynia)", differentiates main tribal alliances of Croats and Volhynians, but also Croats from Tiversti and Drevlians.

There also scholars, mainly Polish, who refute the Croats lived near the Carpathians close to the Polish-Ukrainian border and rather place them further to the East in the direction of Vyatichi while locate the Lendians in Upper San and Upper Dniester or whole of Western Ukraine, but it is not well founded, as Polish historiography periodically in new variations uses the same dispute of the localization of the Lendians to establish the legitimacy of Polish claims to the Ukrainian border area in the mid-1940s, although such political claims don't exist anymore. Nada Klaić thought the Croats had migrated from Carantania, rather than from East and West Slavic territory, but such an idea is rejected by older and newer generation of historians.

Toponyms and anthroponyms
The extensive toponomastic studies, and their critical review by Henryk Łowmiański, show existence of at least several toponyms of settlements in Poland and Czech Republic whose origin is related to Croatian tribal organization and not late medieval migrations. These are in Poland: Klwaty (Krwathi, Chrwathi Phirleonis), Klwatka Szlachecka (Krhwathi Powałya, Chrwathi), Klwatka Królewska (Krwathka, Chrwatka) around the city of Radom, Chirwatowa Wola near Wisłoka river and Horwaty near San river. In Czech Republic: two Charvátce near Ohře river, Charvátec near city of Dobrovice on river Elbe, Charvâty and Charváty near Morava river. In Czech Republic only the toponyms in Moravia have the archaic tribal names, while in Bohemia are derivations, implying were formed on the periphery or outside of the Croatian territory. Seemingly the territory of Croatia corresponded to the territory of Lesser Poland. Interestingly, surnames derived from Croatian ethnonym in Poland are recorded since the 14th century in Kraków, Przemyśl and else, and generally among Polish native nobility, peasants, and local residents, but not among the foreigners. They used it as a nickname, but probably due to the influence of immigration from the Kingdom of Hungary. According to Hanna Popowska-Taborska, although also Grigoriĭ Andreevich Ilʹinskiĭ tried to locate White Croatia using toponyms with the root *běl- (Biała river and Bielsko-Biała), such arguments can be hardly accepted because too many centuries passed between the 7th century migration and first mention of these toponyms and anthroponyms.

See also
Origin hypotheses of the Croats
Red Croatia
White Serbia

Gallery

References

Sources

 
 

 
 
 

 ISBN 978-966-8067-43-10

External links 

Early medieval Poland
Historical regions in Ukraine
History of the Croats
10th century in Europe